Bertram; or The Castle of St. Aldobrand is an 1816 Gothic tragedy by the Irish writer Charles Maturin, his first and most successful play. It premiered at the Theatre Royal, Drury Lane in London on 9 May 1816. The original case included Edmund Kean as Bertram, Alexander Pope as St Aldobrand, Charles Holland as Prior of St Anslem, John Powell as Monk, Thomas Cooke as Robber, Margaret Somerville as Imogine and  Susan Boyce as Clotilda. The prologue was written by John Hobhouse. The 1827 opera Il pirata composed by Vincenzo Bellini uses a libretto by Felice Romani inspired by Maturin's work.

References

Bibliography
 Greene, John C. Theatre in Dublin, 1745-1820: A Calendar of Performances, Volume 6. Lexington Books, 2011.
 Murray, Christopher John. Encyclopedia of the Romantic Era, 1760-1850, Volume 2. Taylor & Francis, 2004.
 Nicoll, Allardyce. A History of Early Nineteenth Century Drama 1800-1850. Cambridge University Press, 1930.

1816 plays
West End plays
British plays
Irish plays
 Plays by Charles Maturin